(The mayor of Saardam) is an 1827 melodramma giocoso (opera buffa) in two acts by Gaetano Donizetti. The libretto, by Domenico Gilardoni, was based on the 1818 play  by Mélesville, Jean-Toussaint Merle and Eugène Cantiran de Boirie. Albert Lortzing's 1837 opera Zar und Zimmermann is ultimately based, via a German translation, on the same French play. The plot concerns a famous episode in the life of Peter the Great, in which he disguised himself under an assumed name as a worker in the shipyards of Saardam, and has certain similarities to Donizetti's earlier 1-act farce Il falegname di Livonia.

Performance history
19th century
The opera premiered at the Teatro del Fondo in Naples on 19 August 1827. The lead soprano role of Marietta was composed for prima donna Caroline Unger, who received high praise. The opera itself had a slow start, but soon the Neapolitans loved it, for Donizetti was very popular in that city; it was still in the repertory the following year and achieved more than thirty-five performances. However, when the opera was staged at the Teatro alla Scala in Milan on 2 January 1828, and in Rome in June, it completely failed, receiving but a single performance in each city. Its Milan failure pleased Donizetti's younger competitor, Vincenzo Bellini, whose Il pirata had won great critical and popular acclaim in Milan in October of the previous year.

20th century and beyond

The opera was also produced in Barcelona (1829), Vienna (1836), Berlin (1837), and Budapest (1839), but was then ignored until 1973, when it was staged in the town of its setting, now called Zaandam, where it received nine performances and was recorded.

Roles

Historical background
Peter the Great was the tsar of Russia between 1672 and 1725. After his mother's death in 1694, he made a series of crucial reforms for Russia that in consequence became a great power. As part of this endeavor in 1697 he went on a diplomatic mission to Western Europe. In August he was incognito in Zaandam (Saardam) in order to study the Dutch shipbuilding and wind powered industries. Here he rented a small house near the shipyards from a Dutch smith who had worked in Moscow. His anonymity only lasted a few days, and he left for Amsterdam, leaving a number of his party behind to learn the trades. During the five months in Holland he interacted most extensively with Nicolaes Witsen, the mayor of Amsterdam, who was an expert on both Russian affairs and on shipbuilding.

In 1703, Peter the Great founded Saint Petersburg and in 1712 he married his second wife, a peasant of Livonia who succeeded the throne under the name of Catherine I. In 1717 he revisited Holland, and in March and August visited Zaandam again, this time accompanied by Catherine.

Synopsis
Place: Saardam, Holland
Time: end of the 17th century

Peter the Great pretends to be a carpenter in shipyards in Saardam and works with the Russian defector Flimann. Flimann is in humble condition and is desperate to marry Marietta, the daughter of the mayor. The mayor, knowing that the Tsar has come to town in disguise, becomes convinced that Flimann is Peter the Great. Meanwhile, the true tsar is called home to quell a revolt and has to reveal his true identity. Before leaving, he gives Flimann a high title, which will enable him to marry his Marietta.

Recordings

References
Notes

Cited sources
 
 
 
 

 
 

Other sources
Allitt, John Stewart (1991), Donizetti: in the light of Romanticism and the teaching of Johann Simon Mayr, Shaftesbury: Element Books, Ltd (UK); Rockport, MA: Element, Inc.(USA)
Ashbrook, William (1998), "Donizetti, Gaetano" in Stanley Sadie (Ed.), The New Grove Dictionary of Opera, Vol. One. London: MacMillan Publishers, Inc.  
 Ashbrook, William and Hibberd, Sarah (2001). "Gaetano Donizetti" in Amanda Holden (ed.), The New Penguin Opera Guide, 2001, pp. 224–247.
Black, John (1982), Donizetti's Operas in Naples, 1822—1848. London: The Donizetti Society.
Loewenberg, Alfred (1970). Annals of Opera, 1597-1940, 2nd edition. Rowman and Littlefield
 Sadie, Stanley, editor (1992). The New Grove Dictionary of Opera (4 volumes). London: Macmillan. .
 Timms, Colin (1992). "Casaccia" in Sadie 1992, vol. 1, pp. 749–750.

External links
 Donizetti Society (London) website
 
 

Operas by Gaetano Donizetti
Italian-language operas
Operas set in the Netherlands
1827 operas
Operas
Operas set in the 17th century
Cultural depictions of Peter the Great
Operas based on plays